Domergue is a French surname. Notable people with the surname include:

Faith Domergue (1924–1999), American film actress
François-Urbain Domergue (1745–1810), French grammarian and journalist
Jacques Domergue (born 1953), French politician
Jean-François Domergue (born 1957), French footballer
Jean-Gabriel Domergue (1889–1962), French artist
Marcel Domergue (1901–?), French footballer
Robert Domergue (1921–2014), French footballer

See also
 Doumergue

Surnames of French origin
Occitan-language surnames